Oecomys auyantepui, also known as the Guianan oecomys and north Amazonian arboreal rice rat, is a species of rodent in the genus Oecomys from South America. It is found in Guyana, Suriname, French Guiana, and nearby regions of Venezuela and Brazil. It is an arboreal rodent known from the understory of primary rainforest, found at altitudes from sea level to 1100 m.

The nematode Guerrerostrongylus marginalis is an intestinal parasite of O. auyantepui.

References

Literature cited
 Catzeflis F., Barrioz S., Szpigel JF, de Thoisy B. 2014. Marsupiaux et Rongeurs de Guyane. Édition Institut Pasteur de la Guyane, Cayenne, 128 p. .
 Duff, A. and Lawson, A. 2004.  Mammals of the World: A checklist. New Haven: Yale University Press. .
 
 

Oecomys
Mammals described in 1939
Taxa named by George Henry Hamilton Tate